117 may refer to:

117 (number)
AD 117
117 BC
117 (emergency telephone number)
117 (MBTA bus)
117 (TFL bus)
117 (New Jersey bus)
117°, a 1998 album by Izzy Stradlin
No. 117 (SPARTAN-II soldier ID), personal name John, the Master Chief (Halo)

See also

List of highways numbered 117
Tennessine, synthetic chemical element with atomic number 117
11/7 (disambiguation)

17 (disambiguation)
B117 (disambiguation)
F-117 (disambiguation)